First Belgrade Gymnasium is a gymnasium (Central European type of grammar school) with a long tradition, founded in 1839 in Belgrade, Serbia. Since 1938, it is situated in the center of the city, on 61 Cara Dušana Street. The Church of St. Alexander Nevsky is located next to the school.

In October 1838, Kragujevac was the capital of Serbia. But despite it being the main cultural center at the time, Miloš Obrenović decided for First Belgrade Gymnasium (grammar school) to be founded in Belgrade, in an area called Dorćol (Dort-yol). The school was instituted on 18 June 1839.  At that time, it was located on Jug Bogdan's Street number 26, which was the residence of Nikola Selaković. At the very beginning, it had only two grades, but in the next four years, the school's system was significantly upgraded so at the end, it had a total of five grades. It could be said that in the 1842–43 school year, the school actually became a real gymnasium.

The first school professors were Vasilije Berara and Mihajlo Popović, who functioned as the school's headmaster as well. According to a law from 1844, and thanks to Jovan Sterija Popović, teachings and classes in the school were reformed, so that the 6th grade was actually added to the school's system. With this addition, First Belgrade Gymnasium received the same status like other European higher class schools. That year, the school got its first library.

Notable alumni
 King Peter I
Aleksandar Belić, linguist
 Aleksandar Deroko, architect
 Boris Tadić, former President of Serbia
 Branislav Petronijević, philosopher
 Dragutin Dimitrijević Apis, military officer, member of the Black Hand organisation
 Gavrilo Princip, revolutionary
 Jovan Cvijić, founder of geographic sciences in Serbia	 
 Jovan Skerlić, writer
 Ljubomir Stojanović, philologist
 Mihajlo Petrović Alas, mathematician and inventor
 Milan Stojadinović, Prime Minister of Kingdom of Yugoslavia
 Sima Lozanić, chemist and university rector	
 Slobodan Jovanović, Prime Minister of the Royal Yugoslav government-in-exile
 Vojvoda Stepa Stepanović, World War I Field Marshal 
 Stojan Novaković, scholar, Prime Minister of Kingdom of Serbia	
 Velibor Vasović, footballer
 Veselin Čajkanović, classicist
 Vuk Jeremić, former president of United Nations General Assembly
 Vojvoda Živojin Mišić, World War I Field Marshal

References

External links
 Prva beogradska slavi 170. rođendan!, MTS Mondo, June 6, 2009
 Official blog, moderated by professors and students

Schools in Serbia
Buildings and structures in Belgrade
Education in Belgrade
Educational institutions established in 1839
Gymnasiums in Belgrade
1839 establishments in Serbia